Seidelia is a plant genus of the family Euphorbiaceae first described as a genus in 1858. The genus is endemic to Southern Africa (South Africa and Namibia).

Species
 Seidelia firmula (Prain) Pax & K.Hoffm - Namibia, Cape Province
 Seidelia triandra (E.Mey.) Pax - Namibia, Cape Province, Free State

References

Acalypheae
Euphorbiaceae genera
Flora of Southern Africa
Taxa named by Henri Ernest Baillon